Tears Roll Down (Greatest Hits 82–92) is a greatest hits album by the English pop/rock band Tears for Fears. It was released on 2 March 1992 by Fontana Records. Preceded by the single "Laid So Low (Tears Roll Down)", the album contains the band's UK and international top-20 singles (except "Everybody Wants to Run the World"). It has been certified double platinum in the United Kingdom, platinum in the United States, and gold in several other countries including Canada, France and Germany.

Tears Roll Down originally peaked at number one in Italy, number two in the UK and France and reached the top 10 in several other countries upon its release, but re-entered the UK top 10 at number six in 2004 for several weeks following the success of Gary Jules' cover version of "Mad World".

A compilation video under the same title was also released in 1992, and later issued on DVD. The album itself was reissued in 2004 as a 2-CD/1-DVD set under the "Sound+Vision Deluxe" line, and again in 2005 with a bonus disc containing several remixes. The compilation was eventually supplanted by another greatest hits package, Rule the World: The Greatest Hits, in 2017, and is now out of print.

Track listing

2004 Bonus Disc

2005 bonus remix disc 
"Shout" (Skylark 12" Extended Club Mix) – 9:07
"Change" (Joey Negro Punkdisco Mix) – 7:42
"Head Over Heels" (Dave Bascombe 7" N. Mix) – 4:17
"Pale Shelter" (New Extended Version) – 7:09
"Laid So Low (Tears Roll Down)" (US Dance Mix) – 3:18
"Mothers Talk" (Beat of the Drum Mix) – 8:57
"Sowing the Seeds of Love" (Wen's Overnight Mix) – 6:48
"Shout" (Jakatta Thrilled-Out Mix) – 5:36
"Woman in Chains" (Jakatta Awakened Mix Radio Edit) – 3:45
"Mad World" (Afterlife Remix) – 5:18
"Everybody Wants to Rule the World" (The Chosen Few Remix) – 6:34

Notes
 Track 3 is the "Remix" from the original 7" (1985).
 Track 4 is the "Extended Version" from the re-released 12" (1983).
 Track 5 is the original "Sowing the Seeds of Love" (1989) B-side "Tears Roll Down", the same version can be found on the Saturnine Martial & Lunatic compilation.
 Track 7 is similar to the "Full Version" from the 12" and CD single (1989), but has an additional echo on "Feel the pain".

2020 SACD 
"Sowing the Seeds of Love" – 6:19
"Everybody Wants to Rule the World" – 4:10
"Woman in Chains" – 6:28
"Shout" – 6:33
"Head over Heels" – 4:14
"Mad World" – 3:29
"Pale Shelter" – 4:39
"I Believe" – 4:49
"Laid So Low (Tears Roll Down)" – 4:44
"Mothers Talk" – 4:59
"Change" – 3:54
"Advice for the Young at Heart" – 4:54
"Shout" (Skylark 12" Extended Club Mix) – 9:07
"Everybody Wants to Rule the World" (The Chosen Few Remix) – 6:34

Charts

Weekly charts

Year-end charts

Certifications

Video compilation
The video compilation of Tears Roll Down (Greatest Hits 82–92) was released in 1992 in conjunction with the album, featuring an identical track list. It was reissued on DVD in 2003 with a different cover featuring a still from the "Sowing the Seeds of Love" promo video under Universal Music's "Classic Clips" imprint. After the Tears Roll Down album made a return to the UK top 10 in 2004, the DVD was reissued with the original white "sunflower" cover. The DVD release includes a 5.1 surround sound audio option as well as 2.0 stereo.

Track listing
"Sowing the Seeds of Love" – 6:19
"Everybody Wants to Rule the World" – 4:11
"Woman in Chains" – 6:28
"Shout" – 6:33
"Head over Heels" – 4:14
"Mad World" – 3:29
"Pale Shelter" – 4:39
"I Believe" – 4:50
"Laid So Low (Tears Roll Down)" – 4:44
"Mothers Talk" – 4:59
"Change" – 3:54
"Advice for the Young at Heart" – 4:54

References

Tears for Fears albums
1992 greatest hits albums
Fontana Records compilation albums
Mercury Records compilation albums
PolyGram compilation albums
PolyGram video albums
1992 video albums
Music video compilation albums
Albums produced by Chris Hughes (musician)
Albums produced by Tim Palmer